Ernest Entwistle Cheesman (21 September 1898 Wood Green - 9 January 1983 Weybridge), was an English botanist noted for his work on the family Musaceae. He was the son of Charles Cheesman and 
Grace Lizzie Davies. About August 1936 he married Ellen Elizabeth B. Weston (1892-1966).

Cheesman collected in Trinidad and Tobago in 1925-1937, working as professor of botany at the Trinidad Imperial College of Tropical Agriculture  and publishing Flora of Trinidad and Tobago with R. O. Williams in 1929. He became interested in the cultivation of cocoa while in Trinidad and wrote a number of papers on the subject - 
Cheesman E.E. 1935. The vegetative propagation of cocoa. Tropical Agriculture 12(9): 240-246.
Cheesman E.E. 1936. The vegetative propagation of cocoa. VII.- Root systems of cuttings. Page 7, plates 3 & 4 in Fifth Annual Report on Cocoa Research 1935, Trinidad.
Cheesman E.E. 1941. General notes on field experiments CRB1 to CRB6. Pages 4–11 in Tenth Annual Report on Cocoa Research 1940. Trinidad.

Returning to England he worked on the taxonomy of Musaceae at the Royal Botanic Gardens, Kew during the 1940s. As a result of his studies he revived the genus Ensete in 1947 (Kew Bull. 1947, 97), first published in 1862 by Paul Fedorowitsch Horaninow (1796-1865), but then not accepted. Cheesman made it clear that there are no wild Musa native to Africa, only Ensete, and that Ensete is monocarpic, has large seeds and 9 haploid chromosomes.

Cheesman noted in 1948 of bananas "Some botanists have regarded the seedless forms as ranking with the fertile species and have bestowed Latin binomials upon them. Others have preferred to regard them as varieties of one mythical "species" (usually called "Musa sapientum") which is supposed to exist somewhere in the wild and fertile condition … Such mistakes... are not peculiar to the genus "Musa", but they are unusually conspicuous in this group". Giving a seed-bearing wild species the status of subspecies to a seedless cultivar is a good example of the stultifying effect formal nomenclature has had on crop taxonomy. 

Musa cheesmanii N.W.Simmonds is a tribute to his work on the Musaceae. Simmonds was a 1950s research worker on Musaceae at the Imperial College of Tropical Agriculture in Trinidad, Cheesman's 1930s place of work.

Some Publications 
 Cheesman, E.E. 1931  Banana breeding at the Imperial College of Tropical Agriculture - A progress report. H.M. Stationery Office in London . 
 Cheesman, E.E. 1932  Genetic and cytological studies of Musa. I. Certain hybrids of the Gros Michel banana Journal of Genetics 26: 291-312
 Cheesman, E.E. 1947  Classification of the bananas. II. The genus Musa L. Kew Bulletin 2: 106-117
 Cheesman, E.E. 1948a  Classification of the bananas. III. Critical notes on species a. Musa balbisiana Colla. Kew Bulletin 3: 11-17
 Cheesman, E.E. 1948b  Classification of the bananas. III. Critical notes on species b. Musa acuminata Colla. Kew Bulletin 3: 17-28

References 

1898 births
1983 deaths
People from Wood Green
English botanists
Botanists active in the Caribbean
Botanists active in Kew Gardens